Paʻu Sefo Paʻu (14 March 1953 — 19 January 2019) (also known as Letoa Sefo Paʻu Taumata  was a Samoan politician. He was a member of the Human Rights Protection Party.

Paʻu was from the village of Safotulafai. He was educated at St. Theresa's school in Safotulafai, Marist Primary, and St. Joseph's College. After working for ten years for the Ministry of Revenue, he became a businessman, running a bar, a funeral parlour, and a crematorium.

He was first elected to the Legislative Assembly of Samoa in the 2001 election, but his election was voided for bribery in an election petition. He was re-elected at the 2006 election, and again his election was voided for bribery and he was banned from office. The subsequent by-election was won by his daughter Letoa Rita Paʻu Chang, but her election was also overturned for bribery. He was barred from running in the 2011 election, but ran again and was elected in the 2016 election. An election petition against him following the 2016 election was subsequently withdrawn.

References

2019 deaths
Members of the Legislative Assembly of Samoa
Human Rights Protection Party politicians
Samoan civil servants
People from Fa'asaleleaga